is a 2002 Japanese animated short film produced by Studio Ghibli for their near-exclusive use in the Ghibli Museum. It features director Hayao Miyazaki as the narrator, in the form of a humanoid pig, reminiscent of Porco from Porco Rosso, telling the story of flight and the many machines imagined to achieve it.

The film could also be seen  on the in-flight entertainment system used by Japan Airlines.

References

External links
 
 

2000s animated short films
2002 anime films
Anime short films
Aviation comics
Japanese aviation films
Fantasy anime and manga
Films directed by Hayao Miyazaki
2000s Japanese-language films
Studio Ghibli animated films